Holoterpna is a genus of moths in the family Geometridae described by Rudolf Püngeler in 1900.

Species
 Holoterpna diagrapharia Püngeler, 1900
 Holoterpna errata Prout, 1922
Holoterpna errata errata Prout, 1922
Holoterpna errata segnis Prout, 1930
 Holoterpna pruinosata (Staudinger, 1898)

References

Pseudoterpnini